The Canadian Synchronized Skating Championships are annual synchronized skating events, sanctioned by the Skate Canada, held to determine the national champions of Canada.  They were first held in 1983. Since 2000, it is during these events that the senior teams can qualify for the ISU World Synchronized Skating Championships. Starting in 2023 the Junior and Senior level teams will be competing in the combined synchronized and figure skating championships, held as a single event known as the Canadian National Skating Championships.

Senior medalists

References

External links
 2009 Championships official site

Figure skating in Canada
Figure skating national championships
nat Canada